To See the Lights is a compilation album by the English indie rock band Gene, featuring B-sides, covers and live versions of their songs. It was released on 26 January 1996.

The album was reissued in double disc deluxe editions containing extra materials on 3 February 2014.

Track listing

Personnel
Gene
Matt James
Steve Mason
Kevin Miles
Martin Rossiter

References

External links

To See the Lights at YouTube (streamed copy where licensed)

1996 compilation albums
Gene (band) albums